Stadtbredimus is a commune and small town in south-eastern Luxembourg. It is part of the canton of Remich.

, the town of Stadtbredimus, which lies in the south-east of the commune, has a population of 676.  Other towns within the commune include Greiveldange.

Stadtbredimus Castle in the centre of the town has a history going back to the 13th century when a fortified castle stood on the site. In 1724, today's castle was built on the ruins of the old fort. It was here that Luxembourg's national poet, Edmond de la Fontaine, better known as Dicks, lived from 1858 to 1881.

Population

References

External links
 

Communes in Remich (canton)
Towns in Luxembourg